Basil Ringrose (about 1653–1683) was an English buccaneer, navigator, geographer and author.

Early life
Ringrose was christened at St. Martin in the Field in 1653.

Career

First voyage
Ringrose crossed the Isthmus of Darien in 1680 with a group of pirates. On this trip he created extensive charts of the islands, soundings, exhaustive nautical instruction and symbols to mark rocks and shallow water. Fluent in Latin and French, he quickly learned Spanish to act as an interpreter.

Captain Bartholomew Sharp, Lionel Wafer, John Coxon, Edmund Cooke, William Dick and William Dampier were also crew members. Dampier refers to Ringrose as an apprentice to a planter in Jamaica. At the end of the voyage, Ringrose and several crewmates took the maps and charts to Dartmouth to sell.

Second voyage
In October 1683, Ringrose sailed on the Cygnet with Captain Swan, as the Supercargo. Damper writes "He had no mind for this voyage, but was necessitated to engage in it or starve." On the Mexican coast in Santa Pecaque, the crew looted the village. Capt. Swan sent 54 men with laden horses back to the anchorage, Ringrose among them. They were set upon by Spanish soldiers and massacred.

Ringrose's journal gives an account of the early part of this trip. It is now in the National Maritime Museum in Greenwich in England. His maps and charts have become "A Buccaneer’s Atlas" by William Hach, a noted cartographer in London of the time.

References

1683 deaths
Year of birth uncertain
17th-century pirates